The Catholic University Law Review is a student-run quarterly law review published by the Columbus School of Law (The Catholic University of America).

Overview 
The journal was established in 1950 and is the Columbus School of Law's oldest legal journal. The Catholic University Law Review publishes articles, book reviews, and essays, in addition to notes and comments written by student staff members. Its 2016 impact factor was 0.309, ranking it 125th among 149 journals listed in the "Law" category of the Journal Citation Reports.

Notable alumni 
Notable alumni include Chief Judge Edward J. Damich of the United States Court of Federal Claims.

Staff and selection of membership 
The Law Review selects approximately 50 second- and third-year law students for membership. This selection occurs through the Law School's writing competition and students' academic performance. During the spring semester, first- and second-year students participate in a write-on competition, which is graded by editors. Of the group that participates in the competition, the review then selects its members from those who have the highest combined grade point average and writing competition score.

Symposia 
The Catholic University Law Review hosts a yearly symposium on a select area of law. Recent topics have included The State of Military Justice, the Judiciary Act of 1789, and FISA and the 4th Amendment, among others.

Abstracting and indexing 
The review is abstracted and indexed in:
 AgeLine
 Arts and Humanities Citation Index
 The Catholic Periodical and Literature Index
 Current Contents
 Current Law Index
 Family Index
 Index to Legal Periodicals and Books
 LegalTrac
 Peace Research Abstracts Journal
 Scopus
 Social Sciences Citation Index

References 

Law journals edited by students
American law journals
Columbus School of Law
English-language journals
General law journals
Publications established in 1950
Quarterly journals
1950 establishments in Washington, D.C.
Catholic University of America academic journals